Zehnderia is a monotypic genus of flowering plants belonging to the family Podostemaceae. It only contains one known species, Zehnderia microgyna.

It is native to Cameroon. It is found growing near waterfalls.

Description
The 0.7 mm long flowers, are inverted in unruptured spathella, which is arranged irregularly, either solitary or in clusters. It has 2 filiform (thread-like) tepals, which are 0.2-0.3 mm long, one each side of the base of andropodium. 2 (or rarely 3) stamens. The Anthers are about 0.7mm long. Pollen in monads (single individuals). The ovaries are 1 locular. The gynophore (a stalk supporting the gynoecium) is up to 8mm long. The seed capsules are globose (round in shape) 0.6-0.7 mm long. The valves are equal, each with 3 ribs. The stigmas are equal and linear, 0.7-0.8mm long.

It differs from Leiothylax (another Podostemaceae family genera) in having a ribbed capsule.

Taxonomy
The genus name of Zehnderia is in honour of Alfons Zehnder (1920–1985), a Swiss teacher and botanist in Wettingen with a focus on algae. The Latin specific epithet of microgyna is a compoud word, of micro meaning small and gyna from the Ancient Greek γυνή (gunḗ) meaning 'woman, female'. Both the genus and the species were first described and published in Fl. Cameroun Vol.30 on page 56 in 1987.

References

Podostemaceae
Monotypic Malpighiales genera
Plants described in 1845
Flora of Cameroon